Da grande may refer to:

 Da grande (film), a 1987 Italian comedy film
 Da grande (album), a 2005 compilation album by Alexia
 "Da grande" (song), the title track from the album

See also 
 Da Grande Sports Club